Kabilamalai block is a revenue block in the Namakkal district of Tamil Nadu, India. It has a total of 20 panchayat villages.

References 
 

Revenue blocks of Namakkal district